The Commonwealth Scientific and Industrial Research Organisation (CSIRO) is an Australian Government agency responsible for scientific research.

CSIRO works with leading organisations around the world. From its headquarters in Canberra, CSIRO maintains more than 50 sites across Australia and in France, Chile and the United States, employing about 5,500 people.

Federally funded scientific research began in Australia  years ago. The Advisory Council of Science and Industry was established in 1916 but was hampered by insufficient available finance.  In 1926 the research effort was reinvigorated by establishment of the Council for Scientific and Industrial Research (CSIR), which strengthened national science leadership and increased research funding. CSIR grew rapidly and achieved significant early successes. In 1949, further legislated changes included renaming the organisation as CSIRO.

Notable developments by CSIRO have included the invention of atomic absorption spectroscopy, essential components of Wi-Fi technology, development of the first commercially successful polymer banknote, the invention of the insect repellent in Aerogard and the introduction of a series of biological controls into Australia, such as the introduction of myxomatosis and rabbit calicivirus for the control of rabbit populations.

Structure 
CSIRO is governed by a board appointed by the Australian Government, currently chaired by David Thodey. There are nine directors inclusive of the chief executive, presently Dr. Larry Marshall, who is responsible for management of the organisation.

Research and focus areas 
CSIRO is structured into Research Business Units, National Facilities and Collections, and Services.

Research Business Units 

As at 2023, CSIRO's research areas are identified as "Impact science" and organised into the following Business Units:
 Agriculture and Food
 Health and Biosecurity
Data61
 Energy
 Manufacturing
 Mineral Resources and
 Environment (being the amalgamation of the former Land and Water and Oceans & Atmosphere BUs)

National facilities and collections

National facilities
CSIRO manages national research facilities and scientific infrastructure on behalf of the nation to assist with the delivery of research. The national facilities and specialised laboratories are available to both international and Australian users from industry and research. As at 2019, the following National Facilities are listed:
 Australian Animal Health Laboratory (AAHL)
 Australia Telescope National Facility – radio telescopes included in the Facility include the Australia Telescope Compact Array, the Parkes Observatory, Mopra Observatory and the Australian Square Kilometre Array Pathfinder 
 Canberra Deep Space Communication Complex
 Energy Centre and National Solar Energy Centre
 Marine National Facility (R.V. "Investigator")
 New Norcia ground station
 NovaSAR-1 satellite
 Pawsey Supercomputing Centre

Collections
CSIRO manages a number of collections of animal and plant specimens that contribute to national and international biological knowledge. The National Collections contribute to taxonomic, genetic, agricultural and ecological research. As at 2019, CSIRO's Collections are listed as the following:
 Australian National Algae Culture Collection
 The Atlas of Living Australia
 Australian Tree Seed Centre
 Australian National Fish Collection
 Australian National Insect Collection
 Australian National Herbarium
 Australian National Soil Archive (managed through A&F)
 Australian National Wildlife Collection
 Cape Grim Air Archive

Services 

In 2019, CSIRO Services are itemised as follows:
 Materials and infrastructure services
 Agricultural and environmental analysis
 Environmental services
 Biological, food and medical science services
 Australian Animal Health Laboratory services

Other services are noted as including education, publishing, infrastructure technologies, Small and Medium Enterprise engagement and CSIRO Futures.

History

Evolution of the organisation
A precursor to CSIRO, the Advisory Council of Science and Industry, was established in 1916 on the initiative of prime minister Billy Hughes. However, the advisory council struggled with insufficient funding during the First World War. In 1920 the council was renamed the Commonwealth Institute of Science and Industry, and was led by George Handley Knibbs (1921–26), but continued to struggle financially.

Implementing the 1923 Imperial Conference's call for colonies to broaden their economic base, in 1926 the Australian Parliament modified the principal Act for national scientific research (the Institute of Science and Industry Act 1920) by passing The Science and Industry Research Act 1926. The same conference led to the creation of the Department of Scientific and Industrial Research in New Zealand.

The new Act replaced the institute with the Council for Scientific and Industrial Research (CSIR). With encouragement from prime minister Stanley Bruce, strengthened national science leadership and increased research funding, CSIR grew rapidly and achieved significant early successes. The council was structured to represent the federal structure of government in Australia, and had state-level committees and a central council. In addition to an improved structure, CSIR benefited from strong bureaucratic management under George Julius, David Rivett, and Arnold Richardson. Research focused on primary and secondary industries. Early in its existence, CSIR established divisions studying animal health and animal nutrition. After the Great Depression, research was extended into manufacturing and other secondary industries.

In 1949 the Act was changed again, and the entity name amended to the Commonwealth Scientific and Industrial Research Organisation. The amendment enlarged and reconstituted the organisation and its administrative structure. Under Ian Clunies Ross as chairman, CSIRO pursued new areas such as radio astronomy and industrial chemistry. CSIRO still operates under the provisions of the 1949 Act in a wide range of scientific inquiry.

Since 1949 CSIRO has expanded its activities to almost every field of primary, secondary and tertiary industry, including the environment, human nutrition, conservation, urban and rural planning, and water. It works with leading organisations around the world and maintains more than 50 sites across Australia and in France, Chile and the United States of America, employing about 5500 people.

Inventions 
Notable inventions and breakthroughs by CSIRO include:
 A4 DSP chip
 Aerogard, insect repellent
 Atomic absorption spectroscopy
 Biological control of Salvinia
 Development of Linola (a flax variety with low alpha-linolenic acid content) with a longer life used as a stockfeed
 Distance measuring equipment (DME) used for aviation navigation
 Gene shears
 Interscan Microwave landing system, a microwave approach and landing system for aircraft
 Use of myxomatosis and calicivirus to control rabbit numbers
 Parkes Radio Telescope
 The permanent pleat for fabrics
 Plasma sintering
 Polymer banknote
 Production of metals from their halides
 Relenza flu drug
 Sirosmelt lance
 "Softly" woollens detergent
 Phase-contrast X-ray imaging
 Method to use titanium in 3D printing
 UltraBattery
 WiFi
 Essential components of Wi-Fi technology

Historic research
CSIRO had a pioneering role in the scientific discovery of the universe through radio "eyes". A team led by Paul Wild built and operated (from 1948) the world's first solar radiospectrograph, and from 1967 the  radioheliograph at Culgoora in New South Wales. For three decades, the Division of Radiophysics had a world-leading role in solar research, attracting prominent solar physicists from around the world.

CSIRO owned the first computer in Australia, CSIRAC, built as part of a project began in the Sydney Radiophysics Laboratory in 1947. The CSIR Mk 1 ran its first program in 1949, the fifth electronic computer in the world. It was over 1,000 times faster than the mechanical calculators available at the time. It was decommissioned in 1955 and recommissioned in Melbourne as CSIRAC in 1956 as a general purpose computing machine used by over 700 projects until 1964. The CSIRAC is the only surviving first-generation computer in the world.

Between 1965 and 1985, George Bornemissza of CSIRO's Division of Entomology founded and led the Australian Dung Beetle Project. Bornemissza, upon settling in Australia from Hungary in 1951, noticed that the pastureland was covered in dry cattle dung pads which did not seem to be recycled into the soil and caused areas of rank pasture which were unpalatable to the cattle. He proposed that the reason for this was that native Australian dung beetles, which had co-evolved alongside the marsupials (which produce dung very different in its composition from cattle), were not adapted to utilise cattle dung for their nutrition and breeding since cattle had only relatively recently been introduced to the continent in the 1880s. The Australian Dung Beetle Project sought, therefore, to introduce species of dung beetle from South Africa and Europe (which had co-evolved alongside bovids) in order to improve the fertility and quality of cattle pastures. Twenty-three species were successfully introduced throughout the duration of the project and also had the effect of reducing the pestilent bush fly population by 90%.

Domain name
CSIRO was the first Australian organisation to start using the Internet and was able to register the second-level domain csiro.au (as opposed to csiro.org.au or csiro.com.au).  Guidelines were introduced in 1996 to regulate the use of the .au domain.

Governance and management

When CSIR was formed in 1926, it was led initially by an executive committee of three people, two of whom were designated as the chairman and the chief executive. Since then the roles and responsibilities of the chair and chief executive have changed many times. From 1927 to 1986 the head of CSIR (and from 1949, CSIRO) was the chairman, who was responsible for the management of the organisation, supported by the chief executive. From 1 July 1959 to 4 December 1986 CSIRO had no chief executive; the chairman undertook both functions.

In 1986, when the Australian Government changed the structure of CSIRO to include a board of non-executive members plus the chief executive to lead CSIRO, the roles changed. The chief executive is now responsible for management of the organisation in accordance with the strategy, plans and policies approved by the CSIRO Board which, led by the chair of the board, is responsible to the Australian Government for the overall strategy, governance and performance of CSIRO.

As with its governance structure, the priorities and structure of CSIRO, and the teams and facilities that implement its research, have changed as Australia's scientific challenges have evolved.

Numerous CSIRO scientists have gone onto distinguished careers in the university sector. Several have been appointed to the role of Vice-Chancellor/President. They include: Sir George Currie (UNZ 1952-62 Western Australia 1945-52), Paul Wellings CBE (Wollongong 2012-21 Lancaster 2002-12), Michael Barber AO (Flinders 2008-14), Mark Smith CBE (Southampton 2019-ff Lancaster 2012-19), Annabelle Duncan (UNE 2014-19), Attila Brungs (UNSW 2021-ff UTS 2014-21), Alex Zelinsky AO (Newcastle (2018-ff), Andrew Parfitt (UTS 2021-ff).

Controversies

Total Wellbeing Diet
In 2005 the CSIRO gained worldwide attention, including some criticism, for promoting a high-protein, low-carbohydrate diet of their own creation called Total Wellbeing Diet. The CSIRO published the diet in a book which sold over half a million copies in Australia and over 100,000 overseas. The diet was criticised in an editorial by Nature for giving scientific credence to a "fashionable" diet sponsored by meat and dairy industries.

802.11 patent
In the early 1990s, CSIRO radio astronomy scientists John O'Sullivan, Graham Daniels, Terence Percival, Diethelm Ostry and John Deane undertook research directed to finding a way to make wireless networks work as fast as wired networks within confined spaces such as office buildings.

In 1997 Macquarie University professor David Skellern and his colleague Neil Weste established the company Radiata, Inc., which took a nonexclusive licence to the CSIRO patent for the purpose of developing commercially viable integrated circuit devices implementing the patented technology.

During this period, the IEEE 802.11 Working Group was developing the 802.11a wireless LAN standard. CSIRO did not participate directly in the standards process, however David Skellern was an active participant as secretary of the Working Group, and representative of Radiata. In 1998 it became apparent that the CSIRO patent would be pertinent to the standard. In response to a request from Victor Hayes of Lucent Technologies, who was chair of the 802.11 Working Group, CSIRO confirmed its commitment to make non-exclusive licenses available to implementers of the standard on reasonable and non-discriminatory terms.

In 1999, Cisco Systems, Inc. and Broadcom Corporation each invested A$4 million in Radiata, representing an 11% stake for each investor and valuing the company at around A$36 million. In September 2000, Radiata demonstrated a chip set complying with the recently finalised IEEE 802.11a Wi-Fi standard, and capable of handling transmission rates of up to 54 Mbit/s, at a major international exhibition.

In November 2000, Cisco acquired Radiata in exchange for US$295 million in Cisco common stock with the intention of incorporating the Radiata Baseband Processor and Radio chips into its Aironet family of wireless LAN products. Cisco subsequently took a large write-down on the Radiata acquisition, following the 2001 telecoms crash, and in 2004 it shut down its internal development of wireless chipsets based on the Radiata technology in order to focus on software development and emerging new technologies.

Controversy over the CSIRO patent arose in 2006 after the organisation won an injunction against Buffalo Technology in an infringement suit filed in Federal Court in the Eastern District of Texas. The injunction was subsequently suspended on appeal, with the Court of Appeals for the Federal Circuit finding that the judge in Texas should have allowed a trial to proceed on Buffalo's challenge to the validity of the CSIRO patent. In 2007, CSIRO declined to provide an assurance to the IEEE that it would not sue companies which refused to take a license for use in 802.11n-compliant devices, while at the same time continuing to defend legal challenges to the validity of the patent brought by Intel, Dell, Microsoft, Hewlett-Packard and Netgear.

In April 2009, Hewlett-Packard broke ranks with the rest of the industry becoming the first to reach a settlement of its dispute with CSIRO. This agreement was followed quickly by settlements with Microsoft, Fujitsu and Asus and then Dell, Intel, Nintendo, Toshiba, Netgear, Buffalo, D-Link, Belkin, SMC, Accton, and 3Com.

The controversy grew after CSIRO sued US carriers AT&T, Verizon and T-Mobile in 2010, with the organisation being accused of being "Australia's biggest patent troll", a wrathful "patent bully", and of imposing a "WiFi tax" on American innovation.

Further fuel was added to the controversy after a settlement with the carriers, worth around $229 million, was announced in March 2012. Encouraged in part by an announcement by the Australian Minister for Tertiary Education, Skills Science and Research, Senator Chris Evans, an article in Ars Technica portrayed CSIRO as a shadowy organisation responsible for US consumers being compelled to make "a multimillion dollar donation" on the basis of a questionable patent claiming "decades old" technology. The resulting debate became so heated that the author was compelled to follow up with a defence of the original article. An alternative view was also published on The Register, challenging a number of the assertions made in the Ars Technica piece.

Total income to CSIRO from the patent is currently estimated at nearly $430 million. On 14 June 2012, the CSIRO inventors received the European Patent Office (EPO) European Inventor Award (EIA), in the category of "Non-European Countries".

Genetically modified wheat trials
On 14 July 2011, Greenpeace activists vandalised a crop of GM wheat, circumventing the scientific trials being undertaken. Greenpeace was forced to pay reparations to CSIRO of $280,000 for the criminal damage, and were accused by the sentencing judge, Justice Hilary Penfold, of cynically using junior members of the organisation with good standing to avoid custodial sentences, while the offenders were given 9-month suspended sentences.

Following the attack Greenpeace criticised CSIRO for a close relationship with industry that had led to an increase in genetically modified crops, even though a core aim of CSIRO is Cooperative Research "working hand in hand with industry [to] build partnerships and engage with industry to generate impact".

Climate change censorship: Clive Spash 
On 25 November 2009, a debate was held in the Australian Senate concerning the alleged involvement of the CSIRO and the Labor government in censorship. The debate was called for by opposition parties after evidence came to light that a paper critical of carbon emissions trading was being suppressed. At the time, the Labor government was trying to get such a scheme through the Senate. After the debate, the Science Minister, Kim Carr, was forced to release the paper, but when doing so in the Senate he also delivered a letter from the CEO of the CSIRO, Megan Clark, which attacked the report's author and threatened him with unspecified punishment. The author of the paper, Clive Spash, was cited in the press as having been bullied and harassed, and later gave a radio interview about this. In the midst of the affair, CSIRO management had considered releasing the paper with edits that Nature reported would be "tiny". Spash claimed the changes actually demanded amounted to censorship and resigned. He later posted on his website a document detailing the text that CSIRO management demanded be deleted; by itself, this document forms a coherent set of statements criticising emissions trading without any additional wording needed. In subsequent Senate Estimates hearings during 2010, Senator Carr and Clark went on record claiming the paper was originally stopped from publication solely due to its low quality not meeting CSIRO standards. At the time of its attempted suppression, the paper had been accepted for publication in an academic journal, New Political Economy, which in 2010 had been ranked by the Australian Research Council as an 'A class' publication. In an ABC radio interview, Spash called for a Senate enquiry into the affair and the role played by senior management and the Science Minister. After these events, the Sydney Morning Herald  reported that "Questions are being raised about the closeness of BHP Billiton and the CSIRO under its chief executive, Megan Clark". After his resignation, an unedited version of the paper was released by Spash as a discussion paper, and later published as an academic journal article.

CSIRO–Novartis–DataTrace scandal
On 11 April 2013, the Sydney Morning Herald ran a story on how CSIRO had "duped" the Swiss-based pharmaceutical giant Novartis into purchasing an anti-counterfeit technology for its vials of injectable Voltaren. The invention was marketed by a small Australian company called DataTrace DNA as a method of identifying fake vials, on the basis that a unique tracer code developed by CSIRO was embedded in the product. However, the code sold to Novartis for more than A$2M was apparently not unique, and was based on a "cheap tracer ... bought in bulk from a Chinese distributor". Novartis was contractually bound not to reverse-engineer the tracer to verify its uniqueness. The Sydney Morning Herald report alleges that this was done with the knowledge of key CSIRO personnel.

CSIRO has since conducted a full review of the allegations and found no evidence to support them.

Alleged bullying, harassment and victimisation
Around 2008–2012, CSIRO fell under the spotlight for allegedly exhibiting a culture of workplace bullying and harassment. Former CSIRO employees started to surface with experiences of workplace bullying and other unreasonable behaviour by current and former CSIRO staff members. CSIRO took the allegations seriously and responded to the articles on a number of occasions.

The shadow minister for innovation, industry, science and research, Sophie Mirabella, wrote to the government requesting it establish an inquiry. Mirabella said she is aware of as many as 100 cases of alleged workplace harassment. On 20 July 2012 Comcare issued CSIRO with an Improvement Notice with regard to handling and management of workplace misconduct/code of conduct type investigations and allegations. On 24 June 2013 Mirabella advised the Australian House of Representatives that in relation to the worker's compensation claim for psychological injuries of ex-CSIRO employee, Martin Williams, which was vigorously defended by Comcare on the advice of the CSIRO, that CSIRO officers had provided false testimony on no less than 128 occasions under oath when the matter went before the Administrative Appeals Tribunal. Mirabella stated, "even in establishing the framework for this inquiry it is obvious there's an inappropriate 'hands on' approach by CSIRO."

In response to the allegations Clark commissioned Dennis Pearce, who is assisted by an investigation team from HWL Ebsworth Lawyers, to conduct an independent investigation into allegations of workplace bullying and other unreasonable behaviour. Mirabella continued to question the independence of the investigation. The first stage of the investigation published its findings at the end of July 2013, and the final stage was scheduled to be complete by February 2014.  Post the Pearce Report, CSIRO overhauled its relevant policies and put in place training and whistleblower procedures to address the situation.

CSIRO and climate change
In August 2015 the CSIRO discontinued its annual July and August survey, conducted over the previous five years, polling to create a long-term view of how Australians viewed global warming and their support for action.  In the previous 2013 poll, 86 per cent agreed with the statement that climate change was occurring and only 7.6 per cent disagreed.

On 11 February 2016, Dr Larry Marshall – a former venture capitalist with Southern Cross Venture Holdings, who had been appointed CEO of the CSIRO on 1 January 2015, caused an international outcry after describing Australia's national climate change discussion as "more like religion than science," a week after announcing hundreds of job cuts to the organisation that will reduce the effectiveness of its climate research team.

In "an open letter to the Australian Government and CSIRO", 2,800 of the leading climate scientists from 60 countries say the announcement of cuts to the CSIRO's Oceans and Atmosphere research program has alarmed the global climate research community.  They say the decision shows a lack of insight and a misunderstanding of the importance of the depth and significance of Australian contributions to global and regional climate research.

The CSIRO has been the target of successive funding cuts under the Morrison government, starting with cuts targeting climate science research initiated by Tony Abbott.

Trademark dispute with Cisco

In 2015, Cisco Systems filed a trademark infringement lawsuit against CSIRO, claiming that the colours and style of CSIRO's logo were too similar to Cisco's. An Australian court ruled in CSIRO's favor and ordered Cisco to pay CSIRO's court costs.

See also 
 Australia Telescope National Facility
 Australian Animal Health Laboratory
 Australian Bird and Bat Banding Scheme
 Australian Dung Beetle Project
 Australian Space Research Institute
 Backing Australia's Ability
 Biosecurity in Australia
 Cooperative Research Centres (CRCs)
 CSIR in Ghana
 CSIR in India
 CSIR in South Africa
 CSIRO Oceans and Atmosphere
 CSIRO Publishing
 Defence Science and Technology Group
 Fraunhofer Society in Germany
 George Bornemissza
 Parkes Observatory
 Peter Rathjen
 SINTEF in Norway
 Susan Wijffels
 TNO in the Netherlands
 Waste management in Australia
 Yingjie Jay Guo

Notes

References

External links 

 
 CSIRO US website
 CSIROpedia Official CSIRO history site
 Commonwealth of Australia. Commonwealth Scientific and Industrial Research Organisation (CSIRO). (1949–) National Library of Australia, Trove, People and Organisation record for CSIRO
 Commonwealth of Australia. Council for Scientific and Industrial Research (CSIR). (1926–1949) National Library of Australia, Trove, People and Organisation record for CSIR
 Australian e-Health Research Centre (AeHRC)
 Centre for Liveability Real Estate
 Issues
 
 

 
Scientific organisations based in Australia
Space programme of Australia
Atmospheric dispersion modeling
Research institutes in Australia
Forest research institutes
Life sciences industry
Industry in Australia
Organisations based in Canberra
Research institutes established in 1916
1916 establishments in Australia